Leonard John Lewis was a British academic. He worked as an educationalist in Nigeria and was a lecturer (later professor) at the Institute of Education of the University of London. He served as Principal of the University of Zimbabwe for the transition to Zimbabwe's independence, despite his somewhat controversial views on education and politics. He has published a number of books on education policy.

References

Heads of universities and colleges in Zimbabwe
Academics of the UCL Institute of Education
Academic staff of the University of Zimbabwe